Barbara Gordon may refer to:

Barbara Gordon, a fictional character appearing in DC Comics
Barbara Gordon (filmmaker), award-winning documentary filmmaker and author
Barbara Gordon (actress), Canadian actress